Megachile baetica is a species of bee in the family Megachilidae. It was described by Carl Eduard Adolph Gerstaecker in 1869.

References

Baetica
Insects described in 1869